Russians in Tajikistan are a minority ethnic group numbering 68,200 individuals as of 2000 Census, representing 1.1% of the population. In 1989, ethnic Russians made up 7.6% of the population. The population of ethnic Russians in Tajikistan is rapidly declining due to low fertility rates and emigration. Most ethnic Russians reside in the capital city of Dushanbe. Regardless of this situation, Russian is provided with the status of a co-official language with Tajik and a status of a "language of interethnic communication", and since Soviet times remains widely used on many levels of the society and the state. Both Russian and Tajik are Indo-European languages, the former is a Slavic language & the latter belongs to Indo-Iranian language family.

Russians in Tajikistan are mostly followers of the Russian Orthodox Church, under the ecclesiastical jurisdiction of the Russian Orthodox Eparchy of Dushanbe and Tajikistan. Many ethnic Russian men have also married and mixed with Tajik women.

Notable Russians in Tajikistan

Political figures
Yuri Ponosov, First Deputy Prime Minister of Tajikistan from 1996-1998
Alexander Shishlyannikov, the first Minister of Defence of Tajikistan

Sportspeople
Vladislava Ovcharenko
Kristina Pronzhenko
Andrei Drygin
Yuri Lobanov
Sergey Zabavsky
Katerina Izmailova
Sergey Babikov
Lidiya Karamchakova
Natalia Ivanova
Galina Mityaeva
Anastasiya Tyurina

See also  
 Russia–Tajikistan relations
 Christianity in Tajikistan
 Demographics of Tajikistan
 Dushanbe

References 

Russian diaspora in Asia
Ethnic groups in Tajikistan